Come and Get Yourself Some is an album by Leon Haywood recorded in 1975 and released on 20th Century Records. The album reached No. 21 on the Billboard Top Soul Albums chart.

Overview
Come and Get Yourself Some was produced by Leon Haywood. Artists such as Ray Parker Jr., Wilton Felder, Roland Bautista and Joe Sample also appeared on the album.

Critical reception

AllMusic gave the album a four out of five star rating.

Track listing

Personnel
Leon Haywood - electric piano, synthesizer, organ
Wilton Felder - bass
Miss Bobbye Hall, Joe L. Clayton - congas
Ed Greene - drums
Vince Charles - drums, steel drums
Tony Drake, David T. Walker, Dean Parks, Melvin "Wah Wah" Ragin, Ray Parker Jr., Roland Bautista - guitar
Joe Sample, Larry Nash - piano
Gary Coleman - vibraphone
Gene Page, James Mitchell, Leon Haywood - horn arrangements
Gene Page, Leon Haywood - rhythm arrangements
Gene Page - string arrangements
Technical
John Mills, Stan Ross - engineer
John Mills - mixing
Bob Levy, Buddy Rosenberg - photography

References

1975 albums
20th Century Fox Records albums
albums arranged by Gene Page